Boston Ironside, frequently referred to as just Ironside, is an elite-level ultimate club from Boston, Massachusetts. They were known simply as "Boston Ultimate" before they switched to the moniker Ironside in 2008. Their name is a reference to Old Ironsides, a nickname for the USS Constitution.

History

Boston ultimate
Boston has been the most successful city in the history of ultimate, with the city claiming 7 national championships. The success starting in the 1980s when Rude Boys won UPA Nationals (1982) and the first Ultimate World Championship (1983). After that, Boston would be unable to capture a championship until 1994, although finish as the runner-up on multiple occasions. Death or Glory, also known as DoG, won the next six national championships.

Ironside
Ironside is the current elite Boston team and is one of the best teams in the world. They have qualified for USA Ultimate Club Championships every year since their inception in 2007. They were a quarter finalist in the 2010 WFDF Worlds, held in Prague. Also in 2010, they were seeded #1 for the USAU Nationals, not having lost a game in the United States that year. They eventually lost to Revolver in the finals by a score of 15-10. They would meet Revolver in the finals again in 2011, and again lost 15-10.

In 2016, Ironside won their first National Championship, winning over Revolver by a score of 14-13.

In 2018 it was announced that Boston Ironside would be merged into the Boston Dig team, the new team being known simply as Dig. The decision was provoked after both teams got to the quarterfinals in the National Championships in Sarasota, Florida in the previous year.

References

Ultimate (sport) teams
Iron